HNH may refer to:
 Herne Hill railway station, London
 Hoonah Airport, in Alaska
 Hope not Hate, a British advocacy group
 Khwe language
 HNH International, the parent company of Naxos Records